Voula Zouboulaki (born Paraskevi Zouboulaki; 24 September 1924 – 7 September 2015) was an Egyptian-born Greek actress. She was the wife of actor Dimitris Myrat. She attended the Dramatic School of the National Theatre, the School of the National Odeon and the Law School of the University of Athens.

Biography
Zouboulaki was born in Cairo, on 24 September 1924. She originally studied at the Law School of the University of Athens after her parents pressure but soon she turned to the theatre and attended the Dramatic School of the National Theatre. In 1951, she wed actor Dimitris Myrat. She began her career at the National Lyric Stage in 1952 and two years later appeared in prose. She later starred in several movies including adaptations from plays by Federico García Lorca, Luigi Pirandello, William Faulkner and Tennessee Williams. She received awards at the International Theatrical Festival in Lisbon in 1964 and at the Thessaloniki Cinematic Festival in 1966.

Zouboulaki was awarded the First Lisbon Festival Awards (1964), the M. Kotopouli Second Prize in 1965, and the First Actor's Prize at the Thessaloniki Cinematic Festival in 1966. She appeared in the film Stella in the role of Anetta. The film won the award for Best Foreign Language film at the Golden Globe awards in 1956. She died on 7 September 2015, aged 90.

Filmography
Stella (1955) .... Anneta
Mono gia mia nyhta (1958) .... Anna
Karagiozis, o adikimenos tis zois (1959) .... Marika Asteri / Liza Aygerinou
Eimai athoos (1960) .... Lucia Dreyfus
Iligos (1963) .... Kaiti Kapralou
Diogmos (1964) .... Katerina Rodeli
Ohi, ...kyrie Johnson (1965) .... Eleni
Syntomo dialeimma (1966) .... Emma Karali
Oi Athinaioi (1990) .... Stavrianidou

Awards

References

External links

1924 births
2015 deaths
National and Kapodistrian University of Athens alumni
Greek film actresses
Greek stage actresses
Egyptian emigrants to Greece
Actresses from Cairo